Juan Bautista Agüero Sánchez (24 June 1935 – 27 December 2018) was a Paraguayan football striker.

Career
He started his career at Olimpia Asunción, which was at time coached by the great Aurelio González. There, Agüero won some national championships. He was later transferred to Sevilla FC of Spain, where he would spend 8 years, playing more than 100 games. For the 1965/1966, he signed for Real Madrid and he also had a brief stint in Granada CF.

Agüero was part of the Paraguay national football team that qualified for and played in the 1958 FIFA World Cup, where he scored two goals for Paraguay.

Titles

References

1935 births
2018 deaths
Paraguayan footballers
Paraguay international footballers
Club Olimpia footballers
Sevilla FC players
Real Madrid CF players
Granada CF footballers
La Liga players
Expatriate footballers in Spain
Paraguayan expatriate footballers
Paraguayan expatriate sportspeople in Spain
1958 FIFA World Cup players
Association football forwards